Veikko Nyqvist  (9 August 1916 – 10 August 1968) was a Finnish discus thrower. He was born in Helsinki.

He competed at the 1948 Summer Olympics in London, where he placed 6th in the final. He also competed at the 1952 Summer Olympics in Helsinki.

References

1916 births
1968 deaths
Athletes from Helsinki
Finnish male discus throwers
Athletes (track and field) at the 1948 Summer Olympics
Athletes (track and field) at the 1952 Summer Olympics
Olympic athletes of Finland